James Beaty may refer to:

 James Beaty Sr. (1798–1892), Canadian Member of Parliament from 1867 to 1874, published the Toronto Leader newspaper
 James Beaty Jr. (1831–1899), mayor of Toronto from 1879 to 1880 and a Canadian Member of Parliament from 1880 to 1887
 James A. Beaty Jr. (born 1949), U.S. District Judge and former federal judicial nominee to the U.S. Court of Appeals for the Fourth Circuit

See also
James Beattie (disambiguation)
James Beatty (disambiguation)